Darna pallivitta, the nettle caterpillar or stinging nettle caterpillar, is a moth of the family Limacodidae. It is native to China, Taiwan, Thailand, Peninsular Malaysia, Java and Borneo. But it is now also established in the Hawaiian islands and Japan.

Food
The larvae feed on the leaves of a wide range of plants, including: 
 
 Areca
 Caryota
 Cocos
 Phoenix
 Rhapsis
 Veitchia merrillii
 Adenostemma
 Commelina diffusa
 Breynia
 Vigna marina
 Cordyline terminalis
 Dracaena
 Iris
 Ficus
 Averrhoa carambola
 Coffea arabica
 Pipturus albidus
 Alyxia oliviformis
 Monstera
 Neodypsis decaryi
 Wedelia
 Tillandsia cyanea
 Desmodium uncinatum
 Erythrina sandwicensis
 Cuphea
 Beaucarnea recurvata
 Cordyline marginata
 Ophiopogon
 Clidemia hirta
 Tibouchina
 Musa
 Psidium
 Jasminum multiflorum
 Arundina graminifolia
 Panicum repens
 Paspalum conjugatum
 Pennisetum purpureum
 Macadamia and Gardenia

When larvae are ready to pupate, they migrate to protected areas of the host and pupate in clusters. The pupal stage lasts for 17–21 days.

External links
NPAG Report on Darna pallivitta

Limacodidae
Moths of Japan
Moths described in 1877
Taxa named by Frederic Moore